The long-tailed marmot (Marmota caudata) or golden marmot is a marmot species in the family Sciuridae.
It occurs in mountainous regions in the central parts of Asia where it lives in open or lightly wooded habitats, often among rocks where dwarf junipers grow. It is IUCN Red Listed as Least Concern. As suggested by its name, it is a relatively long-tailed species of marmot.

Description

Males average slightly larger than females. The tail is 37–55% of the head-and-body length. This is considerably longer than typical of other marmots, although the proportionally longest-tailed individuals of the grey (M. baibacina) and alpine marmots (M. marmota) are comparable to the shortest-tailed individuals of the long-tailed marmot. The eyes are close to the top of the rather-flattened head, the ears are small and the neck is short. The forelegs are longer than the hind legs.

Several subspecies have been described for the long-tailed marmot, but only three are generally recognised: M. c. caudata, M. c. aurea and M. c. dichrous. The last has occasionally been considered a separate species. They differ in colours and some measurements, with M. c. caudata averaging larger than the others. M. c. aurea, the subspecies found in most of its range, is relatively bright golden-buff or orange-tawny overall. Its face is brownish and the top of its head is typically brown to black, but in small parts of its range it is the same colour as its back. The tip of the tail often is blackish. M. c. caudata also has a brown face, and its flanks and underparts are yellowish, but the rear top of its head and mid-back are black, while the tail is black or mixed yellowish and black. M. c. dichrous is black-brown below, but this subspecies is dimorphic in the colour of its upperparts: they are blackish-brown to dull brown in dark animals, and light brown to cream in pale animals.

Distribution and habitat
The long-tailed marmot is restricted to Afghanistan, Kyrgyzstan, Tajikistan, far southern Kazakhstan (where rare), Uzbekistan, northern Pakistan, northernwestern India and western China. In China, it has only been recorded in the Tian Shan Mountains of Xinjiang. Other mountain ranges where it occurs are the Pamir, Alay, Hindukush, Kunlun-Shan, Karakoram and northwestern Himalayas. Although its distribution comes into contact with those of the Menzbier's (M. menzbieri), grey (M. baibacina) and Himalayan marmots (M. himalayana), they are not known to hybridise.

Among its three subspecies, M. c. aurea is widespread and found in all countries where the species occurs, only being absent from the regions inhabited by the two remaining subspecies. M. c. caudata is from areas south of Chitral in Pakistan and adjacent parts of India, and M. c. dichrous is from highlands near Kabul and Ghazni in Afghanistan.

The only countries where it has been recorded below  are Kyrgyzstan and Tajikistan, but in both places it also occurs much higher. It is more tolerant of aridity than the closely related Menzbier's marmot and the more distantly related grey marmot, and where their distributions approach each other the long-tailed marmot tends to occupy drier habitats. However, it avoids places with saline soils.

Ecology and behaviour 

The long-tailed marmot usually forms monogamous relationships but lives in larger social groups, with up to seven adults sharing a single home range. These individuals are likely to be related to each other with young adults normally only dispersing after they have become fully grown at three or more years of age. Adult immigrants are tolerated in the group but only a single adult female normally lactates and rears young in any one season.

In a chamber in one of these burrows the marmots hibernate from about September to April or May, a period during which the ground is covered with snow for much of the time. Different burrows may be used for hibernation in different years. Mating occurs in late April and early May and may take place underground before the marmots emerge from the burrow after the winter. The gestation period is about four and a half weeks and the litter of about four pups emerges from the nest at about six weeks of age. Only about half of the pups survive the summer, some being consumed by predators and others being killed by adult males joining the group. Most adults survive the hibernation period but a rather higher proportion of juveniles die during their first winter. Females do not usually breed as three-year-olds but wait till the following year.

The long-tailed marmot is diurnal and feeds on plant material. It is most active in the morning when about 40% of the time is spent foraging. After emerging from the burrow, the marmot spreads out and do not forage as a group. Food is either collected from the ground by the mouth or plucked from taller plants. Between bouts of foraging, a marmot sometimes stands on its back legs and surveys its surroundings. Group members communicate with each other, emitting complex alarm calls when predators are spotted. They also react to alarm calls of neighbouring groups.

Predators 
Predators of the long-tailed marmot include the red fox (Vulpes vulpes), the grey wolf (Canis lupus), the golden eagle (Aquila chrysaetos) and possibly the bearded vulture (Gypaetus barbatus).
On the Tibetan plateau, marmot species also form part of snow leopard prey.

See also
 Bobak marmot

References

Marmots
Mammals of Pakistan
Mammals described in 1844
Taxonomy articles created by Polbot